The Camden County Hall of Justice is the county courthouse for Camden County, New Jersey, located in the county seat, the City of Camden. It in the 4th vicinage for the New Jersey Superior Court. 

The complex was built in 1982 and was dedicated to Maria Barnaby Greenwald, the first woman surrogate in the county, in 1996.

Earlier courthouses

Camden County was formed on March 13, 1844, from portions of Gloucester County. The first courthouse, designed Samuel Sloan was completed circa 1853. A new building was built circa 1879 and demolished around 1904 to make way for the new one. which replaced it. That neo-classical courthouse and was demolished in the 1950s. At the time many county offices moved to Camden City Hall, where they remained into the 21st century.

Mission Statement 
We are an independent branch of government constitutionally entrusted with the fair and just resolution of disputes in order to preserve the rule of law and to protect the rights and liberties guaranteed by the Constitution and laws of the United States and this State.

Federal courthouse
Also located in Camden is the United States Post Office and Courthouse and its annex.

See also
County courthouses in New Jersey
Federal courthouses in New Jersey
Richard J. Hughes Justice Complex
Courts of New Jersey
List of the oldest courthouses in the United States

References 

County courthouses in New Jersey
Buildings and structures in Camden, New Jersey
Government buildings completed in 1982
1982 establishments in New Jersey
Modernist architecture in New Jersey